Cachachi District is one of the four districts of the province Cajabamba in Peru.

References